Jonathan Tropper (born February 19, 1970) is an American screenwriter, novelist, and producer. He is the internationally best-selling author of six novels that have been translated into over thirty languages. His last two novels, This Is Where I Leave You and One Last Thing Before I Go, were both New York Times best-sellers. He is the co-creator and executive producer of the Cinemax television series Banshee (2013–2016) and the creator of the Cinemax television series Warrior (2019–present).

Life and career
Tropper was born in the Riverdale section of the Bronx, New York City. He studied English as an undergraduate at Yeshiva University and received a master's degree in creative writing at New York University, after which he spent eight years running a Manhattan-based company that manufactured displays for jewelry companies. He wrote at night and on weekends, ultimately publishing his first novel, Plan B, which attracted the attention of an agent, allowing him to leave his job and become a full-time writer. Five of Tropper's six books have been optioned at auction within a week of publication (The Book of Joe, How to Talk to a Widower, Everything Changes, One Last Thing Before I Go, and This Is Where I Leave You).
			 	
The themes of his books appear to stem from his personal experiences: they deal with topics such as being single, growing up, getting married, being married, getting divorced, and living in suburbia. Tropper's hometown of New Rochelle in Westchester County, New York, is a main source of inspiration when creating the characters and settings in his books.
	 		 	
How to Talk to a Widower was a 2007 selection for The Richard and Judy Show in the United Kingdom. Everything Changes was a Booksense selection. Three of Tropper's books are currently being adapted into movies. Tropper co-wrote the film adaptation of The Book of Joe with Ed Burns, who will direct. This Is Where I Leave You was published in August 2009 and was a New York Times bestseller. It was made into the 2014 film of the same name. Tropper's most recent novel, One Last Thing Before I Go, was published in August 2012. The novel was optioned by Paramount Pictures for J. J. Abrams.

Tropper co-created the television series Banshee with David Schickler. The show aired on Cinemax; Tropper served as an executive producer on the show.

In October 2017, it was announced that his series Warrior, based on Bruce Lee's original idea and set against the Tong Wars of 19th century San Francisco, received a straight-to-series order at Cinemax. The series debuted on Cinemax in April 2019 to critical acclaim. Tropper served as showrunner and executive producer. Justin Lin, director of multiple Fast and Furious films and Bruce Lee's daughter, Shannon Lee, served as executive producers.

In 2020, Tropper took over as showrunner and executive producer of the Apple TV+ science fiction series See (2019–present), starring Jason Momoa, Alfre Woodard, and Dave Bautista.

Tropper lives with his wife and four children in New York City.

Films
Tropper wrote the screenplay for the 2014 film adaptation of his novel This is Where I Leave You. Shawn Levy directed, and the film co-starred Jason Bateman, Tina Fey, Adam Driver and Jane Fonda. Tropper later produced and wrote the screenplay for Kodachrome (2017), starring Jason Sudeikis, Ed Harris, and Elizabeth Olsen. The film debuted at the Toronto International Film Festival to rave reviews, and was acquired by Netflix.

Tropper wrote the screenplay for The Adam Project, a science-fiction thriller starring Ryan Reynolds and directed by Shawn Levy.

Filmography

Film

Television

Bibliography
 2000 – Plan B
 2004 – The Book of Joe
 2005 – Everything Changes
 2007 – How to Talk to a Widower
 2009 – This Is Where I Leave You
 2012 – One Last Thing Before I Go

References

External links

 
 New York Times book review, This Is Where I Leave You 
 New York Times, excerpt from This Is Where I Leave You

1970 births
21st-century American novelists
American male novelists
Living people
Writers from New Rochelle, New York
American male screenwriters
New York University alumni
20th-century American novelists
Manhattanville College faculty
20th-century American male writers
21st-century American male writers
Novelists from New York (state)
Screenwriters from New York (state)
American male television writers
American television directors
Film producers from New York (state)
Television producers from New York (state)
Showrunners